Jason High (born October 12, 1981) is an American mixed martial artist who most recently competed in the Lightweight division of the Professional Fighters League. A professional competitor since 2005, High has also competed for Strikeforce, Affliction, Titan FC, the World Series of Fighting, DREAM and the Ultimate Fighting Championship.

Background
High was born in Kansas City, Missouri and has two brothers and a sister. High began playing football and baseball from a young age, before moving to Blue Springs, Missouri at the age of 10, where he discovered wrestling. By his sophomore year at Blue Springs High School he was on the varsity squad. He was a standout in high school, holding a record of 102-23 over three years, with a 44-7 record in his senior year while setting the school's takedown record and finishing fifth in Missouri's state championships. High was also an all-state selection in 1999. He then continued at the collegiate level for five years. He first spent two years at Meramec Community College in St. Louis where he did very well and also qualified twice for the national championships. High then spent three years at the University of Nebraska at Lincoln as a walk-on player, which has a very prestigious Division I program. High had a rough start to his career for Nebraska, going 4-16 in his first year on campus, but was able to turn his career around and had winning record of 11-10 in his last year of eligibility. High graduated with three varsity letters from Nebraska. In his last semester at Nebraska, High attended a college in Costa Rica where he discovered jiu-jitsu. He earned a degree in history and used to work as an operations manager and full-time EMT for a private ambulance company. He was still working in the early part of his mixed martial arts career.

Mixed martial arts

Early career
High had one amateur fight in 2005, a submission win, before making his professional debut a month later. High won his first seven professional fights before making his debut in Affliction.

Affliction
Jason High made his Affliction debut losing to Jay Hieron at the Day of Reckoning card. High was knocked unconscious by one of Hieron's punches.

DREAM
High later entered DREAM's welterweight grand prix. In the opening round of the tournament on April 5, 2009, he faced Yuya Shirai. High defeated Shirai quickly in the first round by rear naked choke. In the next round, at Dream 10, he upset Brazilian André Galvão by decision. He faced Marius Zaromskis in the finals, but was knocked out in the first round of the match.

Ultimate Fighting Championship
High later signed with the UFC and made his debut against Charlie Brenneman on the preliminary card of UFC Fight Night: Florian vs. Gomi, losing via unanimous decision. After the loss to Brenneman, High was released from the organization.

Post-UFC
High moved back to his hometown of Kansas City and opened a facility in Leawood, Kansas with LC Davis and also began training at American Top Team in Coconut Creek, Florida. He rebounded from his two consecutive losses with a unanimous decision victory against Jordan Mein, a young, up and comer from Canada at RITC 40 in Taber, Alberta. He followed that with a first round stoppage of the previously undefeated Keto Allen at Heat XC 6 on the 15th of October.

High faced Hayato Sakurai on December 31, 2010 at Dynamite!! 2010. He won the fight via split decision.

High next faced Rudy Bears on January 28, 2011 at Titan Fighting 16.  He won via submission in the first round.

Strikeforce
On February 7, 2011, it was announced that High had signed a multi-fight contract with Strikeforce. He made his debut at Strikeforce Challengers: Fodor vs. Terry and defeated Quinn Mulhern via unanimous decision.

In his second fight for the promotion, High faced Todd Moore in September 2011 at Strikeforce Challengers: Larkin vs. Rossborough. He won the fight via unanimous decision.

For his third Strikeforce fight, High fought Nate Moore in July 2012 on the preliminary card of Strikeforce: Rockhold vs. Kennedy. He won the fight via guillotine choke submission at just 26 seconds into the first round.

Return to the UFC
On January 8, 2013, High announced he signed a contract with the UFC.

High was expected to face Ildemar Alcantara on June 8, 2013 at UFC on Fuel TV 10.  However, High was pulled from the bout with Alcantara in late April in favor of a bout on the same card against Erick Silva, after Silva's original opponent, John Hathaway was pulled from the event. He lost the fight via triangle armbar submission.

High faced James Head on August 28, 2013 at UFC Fight Night 27. He won the bout via first round guillotine choke submission.

High faced Anthony Lapsley on November 16, 2013 at UFC 167. He won the fight via unanimous decision.

On an appearance with Ariel Helwani on The MMA Hour on November 18, 2013, High indicated an interest in dropping down to the Lightweight division. He is hoping to have his next fight (and Lightweight debut) sometime in early first quarter 2014.

High was expected to face Adlan Amagov on January 15, 2014 at UFC Fight Night 35,  However, Amagov pulled out of the bout due to injury and was replaced by promotional newcomer Baneil Dariush.  In turn, High pulled out of the bout citing appendicitis and was replaced by returning veteran Charlie Brenneman.

High faced Rafael dos Anjos in a Lightweight bout on June 7, 2014 at UFC Fight Night 42. He lost the fight via TKO in round two. High protested the stoppage, believing it to be too early, and proceeded to shove the referee. High was released from his UFC contract as a result.

World Series of Fighting
On August 18, 2015 it was announced that High had signed with the World Series of Fighting. He made his promotional debut again fellow Strikeforce and UFC veteran Estevan Payan on November 20, 2015 at WSOF 25. High won the fight via knockout in the second round.

On March 23, 2016, it was announced that High will fight in the co-main event at WSOF 31 on June 17, 2016 against Bellator and UFC vet Mike Ricci. He won via technical knockout in the second round.

High faced João Zeferino at WSOF 33 on October 7, 2016. He lost via technical knockout in the third round.

Professional Fighters League
High next faced Caros Fodor on June 30, 2017 at Professional Fighters League 36: Fitch vs. Foster. He won the fight via unanimous decision.

High faced Efrain Escudero in a lightweight tournament bout at PFL 2 in Chicago on June 21, 2018. He lost the fight via technical submission in the third round. The ending was controversial as the referee stopped the bout when High quickly moved his hand under Escudero's body, resulting in the referee believing it was a tap. However, upon review of replays, it was clear High had not tapped.

In his second fight in the tournament, High faced Natan Schulte on August 2, 2018 at PFL 5. He lost the fight via technical submission due to a rear-naked choke in the first round.

High was then scheduled to face Johnny Case at PFL 7 on August 30, 2018 for the PFL playoff eliminator bout. However, High could not make weight and Case advanced to playoffs via walkover win.

Regional circuit
After the season 2018 of PFL, High was scheduled to face Josh Weston at FAC 2 on February 22, 2020. However, High withdrew due to unknown reason and the bout was rebooked to October 9, 2020. High won the bout via second-round knockout, claiming the inaugural FAC Welterweight Championship.

High made his first title defense against Jake Lindsey at FAC 5 on December 11, 2020. He won the fight via technical knockout in the fifth round.

Championships and accomplishments

Mixed martial arts
DREAM
2009 DREAM Welterweight Grand Prix Runner Up
Fighting Alliance Championship
FAC Welterweight Championship (one time; current)
One successful title defense

Brazilian jiu-jitsu
International Brazilian Jiu-Jitsu Federation
2012 IBJJF World Championship winner (blue belt, medium-heavyweight)

Mixed martial arts record

|-
|Win
|align=center|23–8
|Jake Lindsey
|TKO (punches)
|FAC 5
|
|align=center|5
|align=center|0:20
|Independence, Missouri, United States
|
|-
|Win
|align=center|22–8
|Josh Weston
|KO (punch)
|FAC 4
|
|align=center|2
|align=center|1:16
|Independence, Missouri, United States
|
|-
|Loss
|align=center|21–8
|Natan Schulte
|Technical Submission (rear-naked choke)
|PFL 5
|
|align=center|1
|align=center|4:18
|Uniondale, New York, United States
|
|-
|Loss
|align=center|21–7
|Efrain Escudero
|Technical Submission (guillotine choke)
|PFL 2
|
|align=center|3
|align=center|0:35
|Chicago, Illinois, United States
|
|-
|Win
|align=center|21–6
|Caros Fodor
|Decision (unanimous)
|Professional Fighters League - PFL: Daytona
|
|align=center|3
|align=center|5:00
|Daytona Beach, Florida, United States
|
|-
|Loss
|align=center|20–6
|João Zeferino
|TKO (punches)
|WSOF 33
|
|align=center|3
|align=center|0:51
|Kansas City, Missouri, United States
|Catchweight (160 lbs) bout.
|-
|Win
|align=center|20–5
|Mike Ricci
|TKO (punches)
|WSOF 31
|
|align=center|2
|align=center|4:08
|Mashantucket, Connecticut, United States
|
|-
| Win
| align=center| 19–5
| Estevan Payan
| KO (head kick and punches)
| WSOF 25
| 
| align=center| 2
| align=center| 0:47
| Phoenix, Arizona, United States
| 
|-
| Loss
| align=center| 18–5
| Rafael dos Anjos
| TKO (punches)
| UFC Fight Night: Henderson vs. Khabilov
| 
| align=center| 2
| align=center| 3:36
| Albuquerque, New Mexico, United States
| 
|-
| Win
| align=center| 18–4
| Anthony Lapsley
| Decision (unanimous)
| UFC 167
| 
| align=center| 3
| align=center| 5:00
| Las Vegas, Nevada, United States
| 
|-
| Win
| align=center| 17–4
| James Head
| Submission (guillotine choke)
| UFC Fight Night: Condit vs. Kampmann 2
| 
| align=center| 1
| align=center| 1:41
| Indianapolis, Indiana, United States
| 
|-
| Loss
| align=center| 16–4
| Erick Silva
| Submission (reverse triangle-armbar)
| UFC on Fuel TV: Nogueira vs. Werdum
| 
| align=center| 1
| align=center| 1:11
| Fortaleza, Brazil
| 
|-
| Win
| align=center| 16–3
| Nate Moore
| Submission (guillotine choke)
| Strikeforce: Rockhold vs. Kennedy
| 
| align=center| 1
| align=center| 0:26
| Portland, Oregon, United States
| 
|-
| Win
| align=center| 15–3
| Todd Moore
| Decision (unanimous)
| Strikeforce Challengers: Larkin vs. Rossborough
| 
| align=center| 3
| align=center| 5:00
| Las Vegas, Nevada, United States
| 
|-
| Win
| align=center| 14–3
| Quinn Mulhern
| Decision (unanimous)
| Strikeforce Challengers: Fodor vs. Terry
| 
| align=center| 3
| align=center| 5:00
| Kent, Washington, United States
| 
|-
| Win
| align=center| 13–3
| Rudy Bears
| Technical Submission (guillotine choke)
| Titan FC 16
| 
| align=center| 1
| align=center| 0:51
| Kansas City, Kansas, United States
| 
|-
| Win
| align=center| 12–3
| Hayato Sakurai
| Decision (split)
| Dynamite!! 2010
| 
| align=center| 3
| align=center| 5:00
| Saitama, Japan
| 
|-
| Win
| align=center| 11–3
| Keto Allen
| TKO (punches)
| Heat XC 6: Bragging Rights
| 
| align=center| 1
| align=center| 2:08
| Edmonton, Alberta, Canada
| 
|-
| Win
| align=center| 10–3
| Jordan Mein
| Decision (unanimous)
| Rumble in the Cage 40
| 
| align=center| 3
| align=center| 5:00
| Taber, Alberta, Canada
| 
|-
| Loss
| align=center| 9–3
| Charlie Brenneman
| Decision (unanimous)
| UFC Fight Night: Florian vs. Gomi
| 
| align=center| 3
| align=center| 5:00
| Charlotte, North Carolina, United States
| 
|-
| Loss
| align=center| 9–2
| Marius Žaromskis
| KO (head kick)
| Dream 10
| 
| align=center| 1
| align=center| 2:22
| Saitama, Saitama, Japan
| 
|-
| Win
| align=center| 9–1
| André Galvão
| Decision (split)
| Dream 10
| 
| align=center| 2
| align=center| 5:00
| Saitama, Japan
| 
|-
| Win
| align=center| 8–1
| Yuya Shirai
| Submission (rear-naked choke)
| Dream 8
| 
| align=center| 1
| align=center| 0:59
| Aichi, Japan
| 
|-
| Loss
| align=center| 7–1
| Jay Hieron
| KO (punch)
| Affliction: Day of Reckoning
| 
| align=center| 1
| align=center| 1:04
| Anaheim, California, United States
| 
|-
| Win
| align=center| 7–0
| Markhaile Wedderburn
| Submission (guillotine choke)
| Iroquois: MMA Championships 4
| 
| align=center| 1
| align=center| 0:45
| Hagersville, Ontario, Canada
| 
|-
| Win
| align=center| 6–0
| Troy Acker
| KO (punch)
| GC 74: Evolution
| 
| align=center| 1
| align=center| 0:24
| Los Angeles, California, United States
| 
|-
| Win
| align=center| 5–0
| Jay Diamond
| Submission (guillotine choke)
| International Gladiator Championships
| 
| align=center| 1
| align=center| 1:41
| Guatemala City, Guatemala
| 
|-
| Win
| align=center| 4–0
| Kevin Burns
| TKO (doctor stoppage)
| VFC 18: Hitmen
| 
| align=center| 2
| align=center| 5:00
| Council Bluffs, Iowa, United States
| 
|-
| Win
| align=center| 3–0
| James Giboo
| Submission (rear-naked choke)
| MCC 3: Mayhem
| 
| align=center| 2
| align=center| 0:56
| Des Moines, Iowa, United States
| 
|-
| Win
| align=center| 2–0
| Bryce Teager
| Decision (unanimous)
| VFC 12: Warpath
| 
| align=center| 3
| align=center| 5:00
| Council Bluffs, Iowa, United States
| 
|-
| Win
| align=center| 1–0
| Sean Westbrook
| Submission (rear-naked choke)
| AFC 3: Impact
| 
| align=center| 2
| align=center| 2:50
| Omaha, Nebraska, United States
|

Bare knuckle boxing record

|-
|Win
|align=center|1–0
|Rocky Long
|TKO (punches)
|BKFC 21
|
|align=center|1
|align=center|1:59
|Omaha, Nebraska, United States

See also
 List of male mixed martial artists

References

External links
 
 
 
 https://web.archive.org/web/20111213125703/http://www.highdavismma.com/

Living people
American male mixed martial artists
Mixed martial artists from Missouri
Welterweight mixed martial artists
Mixed martial artists utilizing collegiate wrestling
Mixed martial artists utilizing Brazilian jiu-jitsu
1981 births
Sportspeople from Kansas City, Missouri
People from Blue Springs, Missouri
People from Lakewood, California
Ultimate Fighting Championship male fighters
American male sport wrestlers
American practitioners of Brazilian jiu-jitsu
People awarded a black belt in Brazilian jiu-jitsu